Seneca High School may refer to various high schools in the United States:

Seneca High School (Illinois), Seneca, Illinois
Seneca High School MCA in Louisville, Kentucky
Seneca High School (New Jersey), Tabernacle Township, New Jersey
Seneca Vocational High School, Buffalo, New York, U.S., closed in 2006
Seneca High School (Pennsylvania), Erie, Pennsylvania
Seneca High School (Missouri), Seneca, Missouri
Seneca Senior High School, Seneca, South Carolina

See also
Seneca East High School, Attica, Ohio